Performance Monitor (known as System Monitor in Windows 9x, Windows 2000 and Windows XP)  is a system monitoring program introduced in Windows NT 3.1. It monitors various activities on a computer such as CPU or memory usage. This type of application may be used to determine the cause of problems on a local or remote computer by measuring the performance of hardware, software services, and applications.

In Windows 9x, System Monitor is not installed automatically during Windows setup, but could be installed manually using the Add/Remove Programs applet, located in the Control Panel. It has few counters available and offers little in the way of customization. In contrast, the Windows NT Performance Monitor is available out-of-the-box and has over 350 performance measurement criteria (called "counters") available. Performance Monitor can display information as a graph, a bar chart, or numeric values and can update information using a range of time intervals. The categories of information that can be monitored depends on which networking services are installed, but they always include file system, kernel, and memory manager. Other possible categories include Microsoft Network Client, Microsoft Network Server, and protocol categories.

In Windows 2000, the System Monitor of Windows 9x and the Performance Monitor of Windows NT 4 and earlier, as well as another program called Network Monitor, were merged into a Microsoft Management Console (MMC) plug-in called Performance, which consisted of two parts: "System Monitor" and "Performance Logs and Alerts". The "System Monitor" naming was kept in Windows XP. Some third-party publications referred to it as "Performance Monitor" however, even in Windows 2000 or XP contexts.

The name displayed inside the MMC plug-in was changed back to "Performance Monitor" in Windows Vista, although it was also bundled with a Reliability Monitor and with a new performance summary feature called Resource Overview. In Windows 7, the resource overview feature was split to a stand-alone Resource Monitor application, with the landing page for the Performance Monitor in Windows 7 containing a pointer to the (new) Resource Monitor; Windows 7 also moved the Reliability Monitor to the Action Center. A new feature added to the Performance Monitor in Windows Vista is Data Collector Set, which allows sets of accounting parameters to be easily manipulated as a group.

See also
 Windows Task Manager
 Process Explorer

References

Windows components